Barringtonia edulis is a species of tree with edible fruits from the southwestern Pacific region, being found on Fiji and Vanuatu. Common names include cut nut, pao nut, boxfruit tree, heart tree, and yum-yum tree.

In Fiji, it is known as vutu (also used for Barringtonia asiatica), vutukala, kutuvala and vana.

Description
The large, glossy green leaves grow in clusters at the ends of the branches. The leaf blades are simple, oblong-elliptical and entire, with slightly undulating margins, prominent veins and acute apexes.

The central rachis bears a spiral arrangement of small, closely-packed tubular flowers with globose, reddish-brown calyces tipped by two to four red lobes, four squarish white petals, a projecting boss of stamens and a single, long style.

Distribution and habitat
Barringtonia edulis is endemic to Fiji and Vanuatu. It grows in humid forests near the coast, at altitudes below . It also occurs beside roads and footpaths and near habitations, and is cultivated in gardens for its attractive glossy foliage and edible fruits.

Ecology
The flowers of Barringtonia edulis are pollinated by moths and bats. The tree is host to several species of fruit fly including the oriental fruit fly (Bactrocera dorsalis), the Pacific fruit fly (Bactrocera xanthodes), and the Fijian fruit fly (Bactrocera passiflorae).

Uses
The fruits can be eaten, raw or cooked, but are said to be insipid. The seeds are also edible, the flavour resembling peanuts. The bark is used in traditional medicine, to treat stomach problems and gonorrhoea, and to induce an abortion. The wood is light and makes fast-burning firewood. The timber is used for light construction, casing and for making canoe paddles.

References

edulis
Plants described in 1866